Saat Bhai Champa was an Indian Bengali fantasy television soap opera that premiered on 27 November 2017 and aired on Zee Bangla. It is produced by Surinder Films and stars Pramita Chakraborty , Rudrajit Mukherjee and Sudipta Banerjee. The show is dubbed in Hindi as "Shoorveer sister" which airs on Big Magic channel. The Odia dubbed version is aired on Zee Sarthak. It was premiered on 27 November 2017 and aired every day at 8:00 PM on Zee Bangla. It  went off air on 3 March 2019 and it got replaced by Trinayani. It is based on the folktale of Saat Bhai Champa as collected in Thakurmar Jhuli by Dakshinaranjan Mitra Majumder.

Plot
The selfish queens led by the 1st queen Manimallika of King Mahendra of Surjanagar try to kill the seven sons and one daughter of the seventh queen Padmavati. The seven brothers become Champa flowers. The daughter Parul is rescued by the maid. Through a series of adventures Princess Parul has to bring back alive her seven long-lost brothers (who are now Champa flowers) and reunite her family. She finds brave Raghav as her partner and evil witch Rani Manimallika as her main enemy. On the day of the wedding, Raghav gets lost, was made a king of another country by an elephant. One wicked sorcerer and the evil queen are behind all of this. Princess Parul rescues him and kills Manimallika with the help of her friends. She marries Raghav and lives happily ever after in Surjanagar.

Cast

Main
 Promita Chakraborty / Roosha Chatterjee as Parul.
 Rudrajit Mukherjee as Senapati Raghavendra and Maharaj Chandraditya.

Recurring
 Samrat Mukherjee as Mahendra / Surendra.
 Sudipta Banerjee as Rani Monimallika
 Solanki Roy / Sonali Chowdhury as Rani Padmavati: Parul's mother and Mahendra's wife
 Manosi Sengupta as Rani Swetanghshi.
 Liza Goswami as Rani Lolontika.
 Sayantani Guhathakurta as Rani Dakahini.
 Priyanka Rati Pal as Rani Bonhisikha.
 Nayana Bandyopadhyay as Rani Maya and a mermaid Sankhomala.
 Sabyasachi Chowdhury as King Nakshatrajyoti
 Tania Ganguly as Komolini 
 Rupsha Mukhopadhyay as Urmimala 
 Sambhabhi as Mukta: Sankhomala daughter
 Mayna Banerjee as Gaitri Dashi
 Palash Ganguly as Veer Pratap
 Madhubani Goswami as Rani Rukmini.

References

2017 Indian television series debuts
Bengali-language television programming in India
2019 Indian television series endings
Indian fantasy television series
Indian drama television series
Indian supernatural television series
Television shows based on books
Zee Bangla original programming
Television shows based on fairy tales